The Cape Melville shadeskink (Saproscincus saltus) is a species of lizards from the Cape York Peninsula of Queensland, Australia, described in 2013. It was one of three vertebrates discovered by scientists from James Cook University and National Geographic in an area of mountain rainforest in North Queensland. The lizards are active by day, running and jumping through the mossy boulder fields of Northern Queensland.

See also
Saltuarius eximius
Cophixalus petrophilus

References

External links

Saproscincus
Skinks of Australia
Reptiles described in 2013
Taxa named by Conrad J. Hoskin